"Sleeping" is a song performed by English singer Rick Astley. It was written and produced by Chris Braide and Astley in 2001. The song was Astley's first single in almost eight years, released in Germany only. Its first UK appearance was on the 2002 Greatest Hits compilation. The song is also the first single from his fifth studio album, Keep It Turned On. It reached the top 75 of the singles charts in Germany and Switzerland.

Track listing

CD single jewel case
"Sleeping" (radio edit) – 3:43
"Sleeping" (Tee's Radio Mix) – 3:58
"Sleeping" (TNT Radio Mix) – 3:55
"Sleeping" (UK Radio Mix) – 3:52
"Sleeping" (Tiefschwars Wake Up Mix) – 6:42
"Sleeping" (Tee's Freeze Radio Mix) – 3:55
"Sleeping" (Tee's Extended Mix) – 5:58
"Sleeping" (Hifi Crash Remix 2) – 6:27
CD single card cover
"Sleeping" (radio edit) – 3:43
"Sleeping" (Tee's Radio Mix) – 3:58
12" vinyl (The Club Mixes) Special Limited Edition
"Sleeping" (Inhouse Mix) – 7:09
"Sleeping" (a cappella) – 3:28
"Sleeping" (Tee's Dub) – 7:39
"Sleeping" (Hifi Crash Remix 1) – 6:42
12" vinyl (The Club Mixes) [DJ only]
"Sleeping" (Tee's Freeze Mix) – 7:36
"Sleeping" (Tee's UK Mix) – 7:31
"Sleeping" (Tiefschwarz Wake Up Mix) – 6:42
"Sleeping" (Tiefschwarz Dub) – 6:42
"Sleeping" (Tee's Extended Mix) – 5:58
"Sleeping" (Hifi Crash Remix 2) – 6:27

Chart performance

Cover versions
The song was covered in 2008 by Randy Jones, a former integrant of the Village People.

References

Sleeping single at Rickastley.co.uk

2001 songs
2001 singles
Rick Astley songs
Songs written by Chris Braide
Songs written by Rick Astley
Polydor Records singles
Song recordings produced by Chris Braide